The Minister for European Affairs in Italy is one of the positions in the Italian government, head of the Department for European Policies.

The current Minister for European Affairs is Raffaele Fitto, of the Brothers of Italy party, who is serving since 22 October 2022.

List of Ministers
 Parties

Coalitions:

Timeline

References

European Affairs